John Lesslie Hall (March 2, 1856 – February 23, 1928), also known as J. Lesslie Hall, was an American literary scholar and poet known for his translation of Beowulf.

Born in Richmond, Virginia, the son of Jacob Hall, Jr., Hall attended Randolph–Macon College and received a PhD from Johns Hopkins University. He taught English history and literature at the College of William & Mary from 1888 to 1928 (becoming head of
the English department and dean of the faculty, and receiving an honorary LLD in 1921); he "was one of the original members of the faculty which reopened the college in 1888". He was also concerned with the history of his native Virginia; he frequently spoke at Jamestown and "compared Jamestown's Great Charter of 1618 and the assembly of 1619 with the Magna Charta at Runnymede."

In 1889 he married Margaret Fenwick Farland, of Tappahannock, Virginia. Their children were Channing Moore Hall, John L. Hall Jr., Joseph Farland Hall, and Sarah Moore Hall.

Hall's Beowulf follows the text closely, with alliteration:

Selected works
(tr.) Beowulf: An Anglo-Saxon Epic Poem (D. C. Heath, 1897)
Judas: A Drama in Five Acts (H. T. Jones, 1894)
(tr.) Judith, Phœnix, and Other Anglo-Saxon Poems (Silver, Burdett and Company, 1902)
Old English Idyls (Ginn & Company, 1899), original poems in the style of Old English verse
Half-hours in Southern History (B. F. Johnson Publishing Co., 1907)
English Usage: Studies in the History and Uses of English Words and Phrases (Scott, Foresman and Company, 1917)

Notes

External links
John Lesslie Hall Papers, 1885–1928 at the Special Collections Research Center of the College of William and Mary
 
 
 

1856 births
1938 deaths
Randolph–Macon College alumni
Johns Hopkins University alumni
College of William & Mary faculty
Writers from Richmond, Virginia
Historians from Virginia
19th-century American historians
19th-century American male writers
20th-century American historians
20th-century American male writers
American male non-fiction writers
19th-century American translators
20th-century American translators